Rhoptria is a genus of moths in the family Geometridae first described by Achille Guenée in 1857.

Species
Roptria asperaria (Hübner, 1817)
Roptria dolosaria (Herrich-Schäffer, 1848)

References

External links
Fauna Europaea

Geometridae